Fort Russell may refer to:

Fort Russell Township, Madison County, Illinois
Fort D.A. Russell (Wyoming)
Fort D. A. Russell (Texas)